Woleebee is a locality in the Western Downs Region, Queensland, Australia.

Toby's Knob in the Woleebee district was the site of the hide-out of the Aboriginal bushranger known as Wild Toby during the 1870s and 1880s.

Geography 

References 

Western Downs Region
Localities in Queensland